Alan Nguyen better known as KiWiKiD is an American League of Legends player who was the support player for NRG eSports. 
He was considering retirement from professional play and returning to school.

In November 2015 Team Dignitas added him to their roster.

He recruited for NRG eSports upon that team's entry into the LCS.

Nguyen attended the University of Texas at Austin from 2011 to 2012 and played on the schools IvyLoL team.

Tournament placements

Dignitas
 SF — IEM IX Cologne

NRG eSports
 ? — 2016 Spring NA LCS
 9th — 2016 NA LCS Summer regular season
 lost — 2017 Spring NA LCS promotion

References

NRG Esports players
Dignitas (esports) players
Living people
1993 births
People from Austin, Texas
American esports players
American people of Vietnamese descent
University of Texas at Austin alumni
League of Legends support players